The 32nd New Zealand Parliament was a term of the New Zealand Parliament. It was elected at the 1957 general election on 30 November of that year.

1957 general election

The 1957 general election was held on Saturday, 30 November.

Sessions
The 32nd Parliament sat for four sessions (there were two sessions in 1958), and was prorogued on 28 October 1960.

Ministries
Holland was succeeded by Keith Holyoake, but the Labour Party narrowly defeated National at the 1957 election, and the government changed in mid-December of that year.

Overview of seats
The table below shows the number of MPs in each party following the 1957 election and at dissolution:

Notes
The Working Government majority is calculated as all Government MPs less all other parties.

Initial composition of the 32nd Parliament

By-elections during 32nd Parliament
There was one by-election during the term of the 32nd Parliament.

Notes

References

32